Sydney Dragway, also known as WSID for its former name, Western Sydney International Dragway, is a $30 million, purpose built quarter mile drag racing facility that opened in February, 2004. WSID is based on international specifications and combines the best in competitor, spectator and corporate  facilities. It is located next to Sydney Motorsport Park and is sanctioned by the International Hot Rod Association following a court settlement on 2 February 2022.

In 2021, the circuit became home to the new Sydney Speedway.

Events
WSID hosts a large variety of events, ranging from international Top Fuel dragster meetings through to Street Meets where the public can bring their own cars to the track to race. Street Meets are held every Wednesday night, except on days such as Christmas and New Year's Day.

Also held at the dragway was Iqon, an inaugural Australian exclusive event by Q-Dance.

References

Drag racing venues in Australasia
Sports venues in Sydney
Motorsport venues in New South Wales
Western Sydney